Tim Stephens may refer to:

 Tim Stephens (karateka), English karateka
 Tim Stephens (legal academic) (born 1975), Australian lawyer, professor of International Law at the University of Sydney